The canton of Étain is an administrative division of the Meuse department, northeastern France. Its borders were modified at the French canton reorganisation which came into effect in March 2015. Its seat is in Étain.

It consists of the following communes:
 
Avillers-Sainte-Croix
Boinville-en-Woëvre
Bonzée
Braquis
Buzy-Darmont
Combres-sous-les-Côtes
Dommartin-la-Montagne
Doncourt-aux-Templiers
Les Éparges
Étain
Fresnes-en-Woëvre
Fromezey
Gussainville
Hannonville-sous-les-Côtes
Harville
Haudiomont
Hennemont
Herbeuville
Herméville-en-Woëvre
Labeuville
Latour-en-Woëvre
Maizeray
Manheulles
Marchéville-en-Woëvre
Mouilly
Moulotte
Pareid
Parfondrupt
Pintheville
Riaville
Ronvaux
Saint-Hilaire-en-Woëvre
Saint-Jean-lès-Buzy
Saint-Remy-la-Calonne
Saulx-lès-Champlon
Thillot
Trésauvaux
Ville-en-Woëvre
Villers-sous-Pareid
Warcq
Watronville
Woël

References

Cantons of Meuse (department)